Delta Monocerotis, which is Latinized from δ Monocerotis, is a single star in the constellation of Monoceros, positioned about a half degree south of the celestial equator. It has a white hue and is faintly visible to the naked eye with an apparent visual magnitude of 4.15. The distance to this star is approximately 384 light years based on parallax. It is drifting further away from the Sun with a radial velocity of about +15 km/s, having come to within  some 7.3 million years ago. The star has an absolute magnitude of −1.20.

The Bright Star Catalogue assigns this star a stellar classification of A2V, suggesting this is an A-type main-sequence star. However, Houk and Swift (1999) found a more evolved subgiant class of A0IV. It has around 2.4 times the mass of the Sun and is an estimated 405 million years old. The star has a high rate of spin with a projected rotational velocity of 175.5 km/s, giving it an equatorial bulge that is 5% larger than the polar radius. It is radiating 350 times the luminosity of the Sun from its photosphere at an effective temperature of 9,462 K.

References

A-type main-sequence stars
A-type subgiants
Monoceros (constellation)
Monocerotis, Delta
BD-00 1636
Monocerotis, 22
055185
034769
2714